Winnie Nielsen (born 14 February 1953) is a Danish former breaststroke swimmer. She competed in two events at the 1972 Summer Olympics.

References

External links
 

1953 births
Living people
Danish female breaststroke swimmers
Olympic swimmers of Denmark
Swimmers at the 1972 Summer Olympics
Swimmers from Copenhagen